The Shanghai University of Finance and Economics (SUFE), founded in 1917, is a finance- and economics-oriented research university located in Shanghai, the People's Republic of China. The university is under the direct administration of the Ministry of Education of the People's Republic of China and is among the national Double First Class University Plan, the former 985 Innovative Platforms for Key Disciplines Project and former Project 211.

As the oldest financial and economic specialized university in China, SUFE has enjoyed a reputation of being one of the best finance and economics universities in China for many years. As of 2021, it ranked the best in China among universities specialized on finance, business, and economics in the recent edition of the recognized Best Chinese Universities Ranking. The U.S. News & World Report ranks SUFE at 15th in Asia in Business and Economics. In 2005, SUFE introduced the academic tenure and became the first university in China to adopt this system.

History
The university began as a business program at the Nanjing Advanced Normal School in 1917. The program was relocated to Shanghai and became the Shanghai University of Commerce in 1921.

Over the years the university had evolved. By 1928, It was renamed as the School of Commerce of the Central University. In 1932, it was split from the Central University and became the National Shanghai College of Commerce. In 1950, the institution became the Shanghai College of Finance and Economics. The institution adopted its present name the Shanghai University of Finance and Economics in 1985. Chen Yun, who was then a top leader of the CPC Politburo Standing Committee, wrote the inscription of the school's name.

Since then, SUFE has developed into a multidimensional university which focuses on applied economics and management, with economic theories as its basis. Its subjects include science, social sciences, laws, philosophy and humanities. Its aim is to train students to graduate with practical knowledge, versatile talents and a broad view. In 1997, Chinese President and General Secretary of the Communist Party Jiang Zemin wrote an inscription for the university: Facing the new century, let us build the Shanghai University of Finance and Economics into a top-level socialist university (面向新世纪把上海财经大学建设成为具有一流水平的社会主义大学).

Present 
At present, the university comprises 12 academic schools, one graduate school and more than 20 finance and economics research centers. It also encompasses the School of Continuing (Adult) Education, the School of Online Learning, the School of International Education, and a vocational school. China's rapid economic expansion has tremendously impacted SUFE, which is now bustling with such activities. In 1981, SUFE became the first finance and economics university to receive accreditation for granting doctoral degrees. In addition, it was among the first nine schools to be selected as an "M.B.A. Experimental Education Base" and one of the first schools to set up a post-doctoral program in economics. In 1996, SUFE joined the Project 211. In 2002, SUFE became the first mainland university to offer a master's program in Hong Kong. All of its programs continue to exceed world standards and are imbued with modernity, internationalism and cutting-edge information. It is included in the Double First Class University Plan published by the central government of China.

Notable alumni 
 Daniel Zhang, CEO of Alibaba Group
 Jiang Jianqing, Chairman of the Industrial and Commercial Bank of China
 Tian Huiyu, CEO of China Merchants Bank
 Yu Zhiying, Chinese professional go player

Campuses 
SUFE has four campuses. The main campus on Guoding Road in Yangpu District is the undergraduate education hub. The North Zhongshan No.1 Road Campus is home to M.B.A. programs, international students and many talented professionals. The Wuchuan Road Campus, which is adjacent to the Guoding Road Campus, has been a new education base for both undergraduate and graduate students. Finally, the Wudong Road Campus, which is half-complete and half under construction, will become a new asset to SUFE in the near future.

International accreditation 
SUFE received international accreditation of its M.B.A. programs by the London-based Association of MBAs (AMBA) in the second quarter of 2012. SUFE is currently a member of the Association to Advance Collegiate Schools of Business (AACSB).

Reputation and Rankings 
The university had been consistently ranked No. 1 in the “finance and economics” category in 2003, 2004, 2005, 2007 and 2008 by the Chinese university ranking (Netbig). According to Tilburg University’s Economics Schools Research Ranking between 2016-2020, SUFE ranked 41st in the world, 3rd in Asia and 2nd in mainland China, only after Peking University. As of 2021, it ranked the best in China among universities specialized on finance, business, and economics in the recent edition of the recognized Best Chinese Universities Ranking.

According to Quacquarelli Symonds, SUFE ranks 144th amongst BRICS universities, amongst the top 350 universities in Asia, amongst the top 150 Accounting & Finance universities in the world, amongst the top 105 Economics & Econometrics universities in the world, and amongst the top 500 Social Sciences and Management universities in the world.

As of 2022, according to the Academic Ranking of World Universities, SUFE ranked amongst the top 51 universities in the world for finance, amongst the top # 101 universities in the world for "economics" and "Management", and amongst the top # 151 universities in the world for "Business Administration" and "Statistics".  The U.S. News & World Report ranks SUFE at 100th globally, 15th in Asia and 7th in China in Business and Economics.

International cooperation
SUFE has embraced internationalization and regularly collaborates with such institutions as the World Bank Institute (WBI), the International Monetary Fund (IMF), and the United Nations Development Program (UNDP). In addition, SUFE works closely with international professional organizations, such as the UK's Association of Chartered Certified Accountants (ACCA), Canada's Certified General Accountant (CGA), the USA's Life Office Management Association (LOMA) and the UK's Chartered Insurance Institute (CII). In addition, SUFE also cooperates with a number of foreign universities, including Webster University (USA), the University of Southampton (UK), the University of Brunel (UK), Deakin University (Australia), the University of Vaasa (Finland), Hong Kong Polytechnic University, Gifu University (Japan), among others. SUFE has created six joint undergraduate programs, which cover the following subjects: economics, real estate management, accounting, finance, international business and international economics and trade. SUFE has signed multiple foreign exchange student agreements and established a number of training centers for international examinations.

References

External links 
 上海财经大学主页 
 The Shanghai University of Finance and Economics (English) 

 
Universities and colleges in Shanghai
Project 211
Plan 111
1917 establishments in China
Educational institutions established in 1917